Hugh Millar (24 May 1898 – after 1923) was a Scottish professional footballer who played as a full-back.

References

1898 births
Footballers from Glasgow
Scottish footballers
Association football fullbacks
Gillingham F.C. players
St Roch's F.C. players
Grimsby Town F.C. players
Torquay United F.C. players
English Football League players
Year of death missing